Zdravko Antunović (born 12 February 1974) is a Croatian professional darts player who has played in Professional Darts Corporation events.

Antunović qualified for the 2012 German Darts Championship in the newly formed PDC European Tour, but lost his first round match to Wayne Jones of England.

He would win the Apatin Open in 2012, as well as the Hungarian Open in 2013.

References

External links

Croatian darts players
1974 births
Living people
Professional Darts Corporation associate players